Grown Man is an album by the American singer-songwriter Loudon Wainwright III, released on October 2, 1995, on Virgin Records. The release is generally considered less stark and somewhat more humorous that its predecessor, History.

Grown Man contains a song addressed to his daughter, Martha Wainwright, titled "Father/Daughter Dialogue", on which they duet.

Track listing
All tracks composed by Loudon Wainwright III; except where indicated
"The Birthday Present"
"Grown Man"
"That Hospital"
"Housework"
"Cobwebs"
"A Year"
"Father/Daughter Dialogue"
"1994"
"I.W.I.W.A.L.(I Wish I Was a Lesbian)"
"Just A John"
"I Suppose"
"Dreaming"
"The End Has Begun"
"Human Cannonball"
"Treasure Untold" (Jimmie Rodgers, Ellsworth T. Cozzens)

Personnel
Loudon Wainwright III - guitar, vocals
Dom Cortese - accordion
Richard Crooks - drums
Steve Gaboury - organ, accordion
John Kaye - percussion
Randy Landau - bass
Jeffrey Lesser - percussion, Jew's harp, vocals
David Mansfield - bouzouki, fiddle, guitar, mandolin, pedal steel, electric & slide guitar
Chaim Tannenbaum - banjo, harmonica, vocals
Martha Wainwright - vocals on "Father/Daughter Dialogue"
Mike Kappus - executive producer

Release history
CD: Virgin CDV2789

References

Loudon Wainwright III albums
1995 albums
Virgin Records albums